Won Shin-hee (원 신희, born  in Kuchon Dong) is a South Korean male former weightlifter, who competed in the 67.5 category and represented South Korea at international competitions. He won the bronze medal in the clean & jerk at the 1970 World Weightlifting Championships lifting 165.0 kg. He participated at the 1968 Summer Olympics and  1972 Summer Olympics.

References

External links
 

1946 births
Living people
South Korean male weightlifters
World Weightlifting Championships medalists
Olympic weightlifters of South Korea
Weightlifters at the 1968 Summer Olympics
Weightlifters at the 1972 Summer Olympics
Weightlifters at the 1966 Asian Games
Weightlifters at the 1970 Asian Games
Weightlifters at the 1974 Asian Games
Asian Games gold medalists for South Korea
Asian Games silver medalists for South Korea
Asian Games bronze medalists for South Korea
Medalists at the 1966 Asian Games
Medalists at the 1970 Asian Games
Medalists at the 1974 Asian Games
Asian Games medalists in weightlifting
20th-century South Korean people
21st-century South Korean people